Mala Rohan is a village in Ukraine in Kharkiv Raion, Kharkiv Oblast. It belongs to Mala Rohan village council, one of the village councils of Ukraine.

History

2022 Russian invasion of Ukraine

On 25 February 2022, the village was captured by the Russian Armed Forces during the Russian invasion of Ukraine. Human Rights Watch documented at least one case of sexual violence by Russian soldiers during the occupation. It was retaken by the Armed Forces of Ukraine on 28 March 2022. On 27 March 2022, a viral video of Ukrainian soldiers torturing Russian prisoners of war and shooting them in the legs attracted widespread attention. The BBC among others reported the geolocation of an open-source researcher on Twitter that the video was filmed at a dairy farm near Mala Rohan. Many Ukrainian sources said that the video had been staged, pointing at perceived inaccuracies in the video. The BBC said it could not verify the authenticity of the video nor Ukrainian and Russian accounts.

References 

Villages in Kharkiv Raion